Hans Jorgen Nielsen (born November 18, 1952) is a former American football kicker who played for the Chicago Bears in the National Football League (NFL). He played college football at Michigan State University.

College career 
Nielsen played college football at Michigan State from 1976–1977. In his collegiate career, he made 54-of-57 extra point attempts and 28-of-50 field goal attempts.

Professional career 
Nielsen's only season that he played was with the Chicago Bears in 1981. In week 5, his last career game against the Minnesota Vikings, he made all three extra-point attempts but missed a game-tying field goal resulting in a 21-24 loss. He was released after the miss, playing in 3 games with the team. Overall, he made 0-of-2 field goals and 8-of-8 extra-point attempts.

Personal life 
Since his football career ended, he now works in the pest control industry. He enjoys being outdoors, gardening, and many sports.

References 

1952 births
Living people
American football placekickers
Danish players of American football
Michigan State Spartans football players
Chicago Bears players